The Emamieh school is a historical school in Isfahan, Iran. The school belongs to the 14th century and was built by the order of Soltan Abolhassan Talout Damghani. He built the school for his teacher Baba Ghassem Esfahani. The building was tiled by the Sheikh Mohammad ebn-e Omar, whose name was mentioned on the inscriptions of the school.

See also 
List of the historical structures in the Isfahan province

References 

14th-century mosques
Architecture in Iran